The National Russian Liberation Movement (NAROD ) was a Russian nationalist political movement that existed in Russia from 2007 to 2011. The movement defined itself as "the first democratic nationalist movement in the modern history of Russia"

The co-founders of the movement were Alexei Navalny, Zakhar Prilepin, journalist Sergei Gulyaev and others.

History 
The idea of the movement was born by the journalist Sergei Gulyaev after the "Dissenters' March" held on April 15 in Saint Petersburg. In his opinion, NAROD will be a supra-party network structure, "uniting people of various views - from the left to the right flank, but without the extreme "shiza". The movement has two main goals: "national revival" and "fight against the ruling regime and kleptocracy".

The founding conference of the movement took place on 23–24 June 2007. Alexei Navalny, deputy chairman of the Moscow branch of the Yabloko party, nazbol writer Zakhar Prilepin and journalist Sergei Gulyaev were elected co-chairs of the movement. Other nazbol, Andrei Dmitriev, co-coordinator of The Other Russia coalition in Saint Petersburg, became the chairman of the political council, and the communist Petr Miloserdov became the chairman of the executive committee.

Subsequently, Navalny was expelled from Yabloko for "promoting nationalist ideas".

On June 25, 2007, the Manifesto of the movement was published with 11 signatures: Sergei Gulyaev, Alexei Navalny, Vladimir Golyshev (editor-in-chief of the NaZlobu.ru website), Pyotr Miloserdov, Andrey Dmitriev, editor-in-chief of Limonka Alexei Volynets, Zakhar Prilepin, Pavel Svyatenkov, Igor Romankov, Mikhail Dorozhkin and Evgeny Pavlenko. It was supposed to join the NAROD movement to The Other Russia coalition, but this did not happen.

In 2008, the creation of the "Russian National Movement" was announced, which included the organizations Movement Against Illegal Immigration, Great Russia and NAROD. The co-chairman of the NAROD movement, Alexei Navalny, promised that the new association would participate in the next elections to the State Duma and had a chance to win. He noted: “I think such an association will receive a fairly large percentage of votes and will claim victory ... Up to 60 percent of the population adheres to spontaneous nationalism, but it is not politically formalized in any way”.

In June 2008, at the joint conference "New Political Nationalism", Movement Against Illegal Immigration and the "People" movement signed an agreement on cooperation (information exchange, coordination of activities, monitoring of manifestations of Russophobia). Navalny said that the "new political nationalism" is a democratic movement, in which it will give "a hundred points ahead of the note liberals". Navalny considers DPNI of Alexander Belov and Great Russia Andrey Savelyev to be moderate organizations, emphasizing that nationalism "should become the core of Russia's political system"

As of 2011, the movement ceased active activity and, according to Navalny, "organizationally failed", but formulated a "very correct platform"

Ideology 
According to its manifesto, the movement upholds the following principles:

• The main task of the Russian state is to stop the process of degradation of Russian civilization and create conditions for the preservation and development of the Russian people, their culture, language, and historical territory. The indigenous peoples of Russia are firmly inscribed in Russian civilization and have long since united their fate with the Russian people. National minorities have every opportunity, both for successful assimilation and for the preservation of national identity.

• It is necessary to restore the organic unity of the Russian past, present and future, officially declaring today's Russia the legal successor of all forms of Russian statehood - from Kievan Rus' and the Novgorod Republic to the USSR

• Russians are the largest divided people in Europe. Every Russian should have the right to obtain Russian citizenship and the opportunity to return to their homeland.

• The status of the sole source of power must be returned to the people in practice. The president, heads of regions, members of the Federation Council and deputies of the State Duma must be elected in direct free elections.

• Civilian control over all institutions of power, a broad political reform, the restoration of a real constitutional separation of powers as a system of checks and balances - our alternative to the criminal "vertical".

• Independence and election of judges, prosecutors, "sheriffs" - precincts. We stand for the dismantling of the corrupt law enforcement system that has discredited itself. Jury trial should become one of the foundations of justice.

• Self-defense is everyone's right. Any law-abiding citizen of Russia has the right to free possession of short-barreled firearms.

• Unilateral acts of amnesty for combatants in the Chechen Republic are unacceptable. Participants in hostilities by the federal forces should be exempted from prosecution.

• Persons directly responsible for the adoption and implementation of legislative and other acts that have caused damage to the state and its citizens must be held accountable. We consider it necessary to adopt a law on lustration.

• It is necessary to recognize the priority of domestic debt over external debt. Deposits to Russian citizens lost in 1991-1992 must be compensated.

• "Big privatization" 1992-2006. was unfair and illegal. Revision of the results of loans-for-shares auctions, as well as the largest privatization transactions, should go through the purchase of enterprises by the state at the price of the original transaction.

• Reasonable migration policy is a state priority. Those who come to our house, but do not want to respect our law and traditions, should be expelled.

• Russia must recognize the sovereignty and right to self-determination of those countries that are our historical allies, in particular, Transnistria, Abkhazia and South Ossetia

• State corporations and natural monopolies should be prohibited by law from owning the media.

• “Energy power” is a myth whose real name is “raw material appendage”. Super profits from the oil and gas boom should be invested in technological modernization, which is impossible without a qualitative increase in public investment in science and education.

• Small business should in practice become a way of survival for millions of people. To do this, small businesses must be exempt from taxes, fees and inspections by the state.

References 

2007 establishments in Russia
2011 disestablishments in Russia
Political parties established in 2007
Political parties disestablished in 2011
Russian nationalist organizations